Maumee Bay State Park is a  public recreation area located on the shores of Lake Erie, five miles east of Toledo, in Jerusalem Township, Lucas County, Ohio, United States. Major features of the state park include a lodge and conference center, cottages, camping facilities, golf course, nature center, and two-mile-long interpretive boardwalk. Common activities include hiking, picnicking, fishing, hunting, boating, swimming, winter sports, and geocaching. The site was acquired by the state in 1974 and became a state park in 1975.

Gallery

References

External links
Maumee Bay State Park Ohio Department of Natural Resources
Maumee Bay State Park Map Ohio Department of Natural Resources
Maumee Bay State Park Lodge and Conference Center Xanterra Parks & Resorts 

Protected areas of Lucas County, Ohio
State parks of Ohio
Protected areas established in 1975
1975 establishments in Ohio
Nature centers in Ohio